Aïssatou Tandian-Ndiaye (born 29 August 1966) is a retired Senegalese sprinter who specialised in the 400 metres. She represented her country at the 1988 and 1992 Summer Olympics as well as two World Championships.

Her personal bests are 23.46 seconds in the 200 metres and 51.92 seconds in the 400 metres, both set in 1989.

Competition record

1Africa

References

1966 births
Living people
Senegalese female sprinters
Olympic athletes of Senegal
Athletes (track and field) at the 1988 Summer Olympics
Athletes (track and field) at the 1992 Summer Olympics
World Athletics Championships athletes for Senegal
Olympic female sprinters